Klaas Vermeulen (born 4 March 1988, in Utrecht) is a Dutch field hockey player.  At the 2012 Summer Olympics, he competed for the national team in the men's tournament, winning a silver medal.

References

External links
 

1988 births
Living people
Dutch male field hockey players
Field hockey players at the 2012 Summer Olympics
Olympic field hockey players of the Netherlands
Olympic silver medalists for the Netherlands
Olympic medalists in field hockey
Sportspeople from Utrecht (city)
Medalists at the 2012 Summer Olympics
2010 Men's Hockey World Cup players
2014 Men's Hockey World Cup players